Brinkmannia is a monotypic genus of worms belonging to the family Brinkmanniidae. The only species is Brinkmannia mediterranea.

References

Nemerteans